The Politics of Marche, Italy takes place in a framework of a semi-presidential representative democracy, whereby the President of the Region is the head of government, and of a pluriform multi-party system. Legislative power is vested in the Regional Council, while executive power is exercised by the Regional Government led by the President, who is directly elected by the people. The current Statute, which regulates the functioning of the regional institutions, has been in force since 2004.

Prior to the rise of Fascism, most of the deputies elected in Marche were part of the liberal establishment (see Historical Right, Historical Left and Liberals), which governed Italy for decades. The region, especially its northern part (largely inhabited by Romagnoli), was also a stronghold of the Italian Republican Party. In the 1919 general election Marche was one of the regions in which the Italian People's Party, while in the 1924 general election the National Fascist Party took more than 60%.

After World War II Marche was an early stronghold of Christian Democracy and later one of the few regions where the Christian Democrats and the Italian Communist Party were close in terms of the popular vote. However, from 1970 to 1995 the Italian Socialist Party teamed up with the Christian Democrats and long held the presidency, leaving the Communists out of the regional government. Since 1995 the region has been a stronghold of the post-Communist parties, from the Democratic Party of the Left to the present-day Democratic Party, and became part of the so-called "Red belt", along with Emilia-Romagna, Tuscany and Umbria.

Executive branch

The Regional Government (Giunta Regionale) is presided by the President of the Region (Presidente della Regione), who is elected for a five-year term, and is composed by the President and the Ministers (Assessori), who cannot be more than ten, including a Vice President.

List of presidents

Legislative branch

The Regional Legislative Assembly of Marche (Assemblea Legislativa Regionale delle Marche) is composed of 40 members. 32 councillors are elected in provincial constituencies by proportional representation using the largest remainder method with a Droop quota and open lists, while 8 councillors (elected in bloc) come from a "regional list", including the President-elect. One seat is reserved for the candidate who comes second. If a coalition wins more than 50% of the total seats in the Council with PR, only 4 candidates from the regional list will be chosen and the number of those elected in provincial constituencies will be 36. If the winning coalition receives less than 40% of votes special seats are added to the Council to ensure a large majority for the President's coalition.

The Council is elected for a five-year term, but, if the President suffers a vote of no confidence, resigns or dies, under the simul stabunt, simul cadent clause introduced in 1999 (literally they will stand together or they will fall together), also the Council is dissolved and a snap election is called.

Local government

Provinces

Municipalities

Provincial capitals

Other notable municipalities

Parties and elections

Latest regional election

In the latest regional election, which took place on 20–21 September 2020, Francesco Acquaroli of the Brothers of Italy (FdI) was elected president, giving to the centre-right coalition its first victory in the region.

References

External links
Marche Region
Regional Council of Marche
Constitution of Marche

Marche